Old Dominion Monarchs baseball represents Old Dominion University in college baseball at the NCAA Division I level.

2010

The 2010 Old Dominion Monarchs baseball team represents Old Dominion University in the 2010 NCAA Division I baseball season. The Monarchs play their home games at Bud Metheny Baseball Complex, which was named for former coach Bud Metheny.

2010 was the last season under Head Coach Jerry Meyers after six years. During the 2010 season the Monarchs finished sixth in the conference, their third straight losing season under Meyers. After the season Coach Meyers left ODU to return to South Carolina to take back his old job of pitching coach.

2010 was the first time since 2005 that ODU did not make it to the CAA Baseball Tournament. The team won 17 of its 24 victories at home at the Bud Metheny Baseball Complex. Also during the season CJ Huyett pitched one of the two 9 inning no hitters by a single pitcher in ODU history in an 18–0 win over UMES on May 11, 2010.

Drafted players
C Joe Velleggia – Baltimore Orioles

Velleggia was drafted in 2009 also by the Orioles almost 200 picks ahead of where he went in 2010.

2011

The 2011 Old Dominion Monarchs baseball team represented Old Dominion University in the 2011 NCAA Division I baseball season. The Monarchs play their home games at Bud Metheny Baseball Complex, which was named for former coach Bud Metheny.

After the 2010 season ODU Head Coach Jerry Meyers left for South Carolina. The team then hired Nate Goulet as their interim coach for the entire 2011 season. Despite only being an interim coach, Goulet lead ODU to the CAA Championship game and earned CAA Coach of the Year honors. The 2010 Monarchs went 30–26 overall and 19–11 in conference, finishing second in the conference standings to regular season and tournament champion James Madison.

After the season despite leading ODU back to the conference title game and winning conference coach of the year, the Monarchs did not renew the contract of interim head coach Goulet.

Draft selections
 LHP Kyle Hald – 18th Round, 560th Overall St. Louis Cardinals

Awards
Freshman All-American
Joey Burney 1B/DH

ABCA All-East Region
Kyle Hald P

CAA Player of the Year
Kyle Hald

All-CAA Selections
Kyle Hald P
Josh Wright SS
Adam Wisniewski P
 Joey Burney IF All-Freshman Team
Dean Ali P All-Freshman Team

2012

The 2012 Old Dominion Monarchs baseball team represents Old Dominion University in the 2012 NCAA Division I baseball season. The Monarchs play their home games at Bud Metheny Baseball Complex, which was named for former coach Bud Metheny.

Old Dominion did not renew the contract of 2011 interim head coach Nate Goulet who replaced Jerry Meyers when he left prior to the 2011 season for South Carolina.

In 2012, the Monarchs hired Chris Finwood, the then head coach at Western Kentucky. Finwood lead the Hilltoppers to back to back NCAA regional appearances, a Sun Belt conference tournament championship and a regular season championship. In Finwood's first season the Monarchs won only 19 games and finished in last place in the CAA. Finwood hired his assistant coach Karl Nonemaker from Monmouth University and retained the pitching coach from ODU's 2011 season Tim LaVigne.

Roster

Coaches

Awards
All-CAA Selection
Josh Tutwiler C 3rd Team
Josh Wright SS 3rd Team
Josh Eldridge OF All-Freshman Team

2013

The 2013 Old Dominion Monarchs baseball team represents Old Dominion University in the 2013 NCAA Division I baseball season. The Monarchs play their home games at Bud Metheny Baseball Complex, which was named for former coach Bud Metheny.

The Monarchs announced prior to the start of the 2013 CAA season that Old Dominion would be leaving the CAA for Conference USA for the 2014 season. CAA officials announced that three teams from the CAA would be ineligible for the conference tournament including ODU, George Mason, and Georgia State, all of which were leaving the CAA for other conferences in 2014. VCU had already departed the CAA for the Atlantic 10 before the 2013 season and thus the CAA only had 11 teams, 9 of which were eligible for the 8 team CAA tournament.

ODU finished the season with 30 wins for the second time in three years. The Monarchs would have had the third seed in the conference tournament with a tiebreaker with Delaware if they had been eligible, a turn around from finishing with 19 wins and last place in the conference a season before.

Roster

Coaches

Awards

 All-Conference Selections
Ben Verlander OF (1st team)
Tommy Alexander (All-Freshman)
PJ Higgins (All-Freshman)
Connor Myers (All-Freshman)

 All-American
Ben Verlander

 ABCA All-Region
Ben Verlander

Drafted Players
OF Ben Verlander – 14th Round, 426th Overall Detroit Tigers
LHP Ryan Yarbrough – 20th Round, 602nd Overall Milwaukee Brewers, Did not sign

2014

The 2014 Old Dominion Monarchs baseball team represents Old Dominion University in the 2014 NCAA Division I baseball season. The Monarchs play their home games at Bud Metheny Baseball Complex, which was named for former coach Bud Metheny.

The 2014 season was the Monarchs first season as members of Conference USA. They were picked by the coaches in the preseason to finish 10th in the conference but ended the season tied for 4th. Their 17 conference wins is fourth most in ODU baseball history. They opened the conference tournament against fourth seed Middle Tennessee State whom they lost to before winning their next three. In those games ODU knocked out FIU and Middle Tennessee in back to back games, and then defeated Rice in the semifinals on a walk-off single and throwing error forcing a rematch. In their next game against Rice the Monarchs lost which sent the Owls to the title game where they defeated UTSA for the championship.

The Monarchs won 30 games in back to back seasons for the first time since the 2006 and 2007 teams and had the schools highest win total since the 2006 team that won 39 games. During the season ODU defeated top ranked Virginia 8–1 at Harbor Park for their first win over a #1 team in school history. The team earned an at-large berth in the 2014 NCAA Division I baseball tournament and were given the third seed in the Columbia Regional but lost both of their games 3–4 to Maryland and 1–4 to Campbell. It was the Monarchs 8th appearance in the NCAA tournament all-time since joining Division I in 1977 and their first since the 2000 season. Defensively the Monarchs turned 68 double plays, which set a new school record and ranked 3rd nationally in 2014.

The team did not lose more than two games in a row during the regular season and won six of their conference series with one sweep over Marshall and only lost four series without being swept. The team's longest losing streak of the season came in post season play where they lost their last game in the conference tournament and then were 0–2 in the NCAA Regional, ending the season with three straight loses.

Team MVP and Captain 1B Joey Burney was named 2nd team all conference, which along with his 2010 CAA All-Freshman selection made him the second Monarch to win all-conference honors in multiple conferences, along with TJ O'Donnell who did it in 1991 as an outfielder in the Sun Belt Conference and in 1992 as a shortstop in the CAA. All VASID and ABCA All-Region relief pitcher Brad Gero broke the single-season ODU record for appearances with 39.

Roster

Coaches

Awards

Freshman All-American
Nick Walker OF

All-Conference USA Selections
Nick Walker OF (First Team)
Nick Walker (All-Freshman)
Josiah Burney 1B (Second Team)

All-Conference USA Tournament Selections
Tyler Urps IF
Nick Walker OF

All-Regional Team
Tyler Urps SS

VA SID All-State Team
Brad Gero RP
Nick Walker OF

ABCA All-East Region
Brad Gero RHP

ABCA Regional Coach of the Year
Chris Finwood – East Region

Drafted players
LHP Ryan Yarbrough – 4th Round, 111th Overall Seattle Mariners
RHP Connor Overton – 15th Round, 437th Overall Miami Marlins

Game log

2015

The 2015 Old Dominion Monarchs baseball team represents Old Dominion University in the 2015 NCAA Division I baseball season. The Monarchs play their home games at Bud Metheny Baseball Complex, which was named for former coach Bud Metheny.

In the preseason rankings by league coaches the 2015 Monarchs were picked to finish 3rd in the conference standings. INF PJ Higgins and INF/OF Nick Walker were selected preseason All-Conference. In 2014 the Monarchs were selected to finish 10th before ending the season tied for 4th. The 2015 schedule includes eight match ups against ranked opponents from 2014; Regional host Rice, National Runner-up UVA and other NCAA Tournament participants in Liberty and a rematch from the first game of the Columbia Regional against Super Regional participant Maryland.

The Monarchs 2015 season included wins over two top 10 teams, beating #1 Virginia and winning the conference series from #8 Rice as well as defeating Virginia again when the team was ranked #22. The team also played and was defeated by then #18 Maryland and lost the series to #14 FAU making their record against ranked teams 5–4. In conference play the Monarchs won their series against Rice, FIU and swept LA Tech. The Monarchs lost their conference series to Western Kentucky, UTSA, Marshall, FAU, UAB and Charlotte after a Saturday win was vacated for a 27-man roster violation and got swept for the first time in C-USA play at MTSU. Out of conference play the Monarchs swept the weekend series from Penn and the season match ups from VMI and Virginia and won their weekend series from Rutgers. The team also split a home and home season series from Liberty and William & Mary and were swept by ECU and VCU. After finishing with a 13–17 conference record ODU ended up tied for 7th in conference  standings with the tie-breaker over FIU to be the 7 seed in the 2015 C-USA Conference Baseball Tournament.

On Tuesday, April 28, 2015, the ODU Monarchs hosted #22 Virginia at Harbor Park for the second straight year and defeating them for the third straight time. The game was played in front of a crowd of 6,029 people which set the record for largest crowd to attend a college baseball game in Virginia state history. The 2014 Harbor Park meeting had set the ODU record for fans to an ODU baseball game in Norfolk and was more than doubled at the 2015 meeting.

The 2015 C-USA Baseball Tournament was hosted by Southern Miss and took place from May 20 through 24, 2015. The top eight teams in the conference make the tournament which is a round-robin, double-elimination format. ODU was the 7 seed and lost to both FAU and Southern Miss to get knocked out of the tournament.

In the 2015 MLB Player Draft three Monarchs were selected; IF PJ Higgins, RHP Greg Tomchick, and 1B Taylor Ostrich. This is the second most players drafted out of Old Dominion with the most being 4 set in 1991, 1992, 2006 and 2008.

Roster

Coaches

Awards
Conference Hitter of the Week
Mar 16 – Josh Eldridge OF; 15 H, 4 2B, 1 HR, 3 RBI, 9 R
Apr 13 – PJ Higgins INF; .481 BA, 13 H, 3 2B, 2 HR

Conference Pitcher of the Week
Mar 16 – Greg Tomchick RHP; 6 IP, 1 BB, 1 H, 1 HR, 9 K, perfect game going into the 7th

All-Conference USA Second Team
SP Sam Sinnen
IF PJ Higgins

All-Conference USA Freshman Team
IF Zach Rutherford

Freshman All-Americans
SS Zach Rutherford

Drafted players
2B PJ Higgins – 12th Round, 353rd overall Chicago Cubs
RHP Greg Tomchick – 27th Round, 821st overall St. Louis Cardinals
1B Taylor Ostrich – 34th Round, 1029th overall Kansas City Royals

Game log

April 4 game against Charlotte was forfeited due to a 27-man active roster violation. ODU had won the game 7–2 under protest.

References

2010